Alestes dentex is a species of freshwater fish in the family Alestidae. It is found in Africa.

Distribution

Alestes dentex is typically found in Central and West Africa. However, the species has also been found in Lake Turkana of the Kenyan Rift Valley, and Lake Albert of Uganda and the Democratic Republic of the Congo.

Morphology

Specimens with a standard length of 41 cm have been observed.

Diet

Alestes dentex is known to feed on seeds, zooplankton, and insects.

References

dentex
Fish described in 1758
Taxa named by Carl Linnaeus